The Four Poster is a 1952 American comedy-drama film directed by Irving Reis and starring Rex Harrison and Lilli Palmer. It is an adaptation of Jan de Hartog's 1951 play The Fourposter.

While it is a live-action film, The Four Poster features animation by the studio United Productions of America (UPA). The animation was directed by John Hubley, and was his last project before leaving UPA and founding his independent studio Storyboard, Inc.

In Yugoslavia, The Four Posters animation became one of the key influences on the foundation of the Zagreb School of Animated Films. Director Dušan Vukotić had come across an article about UPA's films in Graphis at an English bookstore in Zagreb. Around the same time, The Four Poster arrived in the country in "a batch of American feature films sent for possible sale to Yugoslavia", according to researcher Ronald Holloway. Vukotić and others studied the film's animation, which also gave them a greater understanding of the still images in Graphis. As a result, the team began to explore design-focused limited animation at Zagreb Film.

Plot

Cast 
 Rex Harrison as John Edwards  
 Lilli Palmer as Abby Edwards

References 
Notes

Bibliography
 Bock, Hans-Michael & Bergfelder, Tim. The Concise CineGraph. Encyclopedia of German Cinema. Berghahn Books, 2009.

External links 
 

1952 films
1952 comedy-drama films
American black-and-white films
American comedy-drama films
American films with live action and animation
American films based on plays
Columbia Pictures films
Films about marriage
Films directed by Irving Reis
Films produced by Stanley Kramer
Films scored by Dimitri Tiomkin
Films set in the 1890s
Films set in the 1900s
Films set in the 1910s
Films set in the 1920s
1950s English-language films
1950s American films